Dion Aiye is a Papua New Guinean rugby league footballer who plays as a  or  for Whitehaven in Betfred League 1.

Background
Aiye was born in Southern Highlands Province, Papua New Guinea.

Playing career
Aiye played for the Kumuls in the 2010 Four Nations. He hails from the Southern Highlands Province of Papua New Guinea and started playing while attending Mt Hagen Secondary School. During his studies at Mt Hagen Secondary School Aiye joined the PNG school boys' rugby team and played against Australian school boys' rugby team in 2007. He then played for the Western Highlands Province provincial team, Hagen Eagles, for three years. After Hagen Secondary he was selected to Kokopo Business College in Rabaul, East New Britain Province in 2009 and started playing with the Agmark Rabaul Gurias. Aiye had his first taste of senior representative football when he played for Papua New Guinea against the Fiji Batis in 2009. He played halfback for Papua New Guinea in the PM 13, Pacific Cup and in the Four Nations in 2010.

He was selected for Papua New Guinea in the 2013 Rugby League World Cup. In 2014 Aiye was also part of the Papua New Guinea Hunters team playing in the Queensland Cup.

References

External links
Whitehaven profile

1987 births
Living people
Hagen Eagles players
People from the Southern Highlands Province
Papua New Guinean rugby league players
Papua New Guinea Hunters players
Papua New Guinea national rugby league team players
Rabaul Gurias players
Rugby league halfbacks
Whitehaven R.L.F.C. players